Idea hypermnestra is a large butterfly that belongs to the danaid group of the family Nymphalidae. It was described by John Obadiah Westwood in 1848. It is found in the Indomalayan realm.

Subspecies
I. h. hypermnestra (Borneo)
I. h. belia (Westwood, 1848) (Java)
I. h. linteata (Butler, 1879) (Burma to Peninsular Malaysia, Langkawi)
I. h. hera (Fruhstorfer, 1903) (Sumatra)

References

External links
"Idea Fabricius, 1807" at Markku Savela's Lepidoptera and Some Other Life Forms

Butterflies described in 1848
Idea (butterfly)